Dubrovka is a rural locality (a village) in Staromatinsky Selsoviet, Bakalinsky District, Bashkortostan, Russia. The population was 13 as of 2010. There is 1 street.

Geography 
Dubrovka is located 18 km northeast of Bakaly (the district's administrative centre) by road. Kyzyl Bulyak is the nearest rural locality.

References 

Rural localities in Bakalinsky District